Diyawan Mahadev, also known as "Diyawan Nath" is temple located in the village named Diyawan in the district of Jaunpur, Uttar Pradesh.  It is about 40 km from the city of Jaunpur close to Varanasi in Uttar Pradesh. A great fair is organised every Monday where thousands of devotees visit the temple.

Nearby cities: Bhadohi, Jaunpur, Mirzapur

Coordinates:   25°36'58"N   82°26'53"E

Hindu temples in Uttar Pradesh
Jaunpur district